Political methodology is a subfield of political science that studies the quantitative and qualitative methods used to study politics. Quantitative methods combine statistics, mathematics, and formal theory. Political methodology is often used for positive research, in contrast to normative research.

Journals 

Political methodology is often published in the "top 3" journals (American Political Science Review, American Journal of Political Science, and Journal of Politics), in sub-field journals, and in methods-focused journals.

Political Analysis
Political Science Research and Methods

Notable researchers 
Gary King
Rob Franzese
Jeff Gill
Phil Schrodt
Jan Box-Steffensmeier
Simon Jackman
Jonathan Nagler
Jim Stimson
Larry Bartels
Donald Green

External links
The Society for Political Methodology's homepage
US News Rankings for Political Methodology

Political science